Raja Tun Mohar bin Raja Badiozaman (born 23 March 1922 – 8 June 2003) was serving as Secretary-General to the Treasury of Malaysia from 1971 to 1972.

Honours

Honours of Malaysia
  : 
 Companion of the Order of the Defender of the Realm (J.M.N.) (1961)
  :
 Recipient of the Malaysian Commemorative Medal (Silver) (P.P.M.) (1965)
 Commander of the Order of Loyalty to the Crown of Malaysia (P.S.M.) - Tan Sri (1967)
 Commander of the Order of the Defender of the Realm (P.M.N.) - Tan Sri (1977)
 Grand Commander of the Order of Loyalty to the Crown of Malaysia (S.S.M.) - Tun (1992)
 :
 Grand Knight of the Order of Cura Si Manja Kini (S.P.C.M.) - Dato’ Seri (1985)
 :
 Knight Grand Companion of the Order of Sultan Salahuddin Abdul Aziz Shah (S.S.S.A.) - Dato’ Seri (1996)

References

1922 births
2003 deaths
People from Kuala Kangsar
People from Perak
Malaysian people of Malay descent
Malaysian Muslims
Malaysian corporate directors
Malaysian chairpersons of corporations
Companions of the Order of the Defender of the Realm
Commanders of the Order of Loyalty to the Crown of Malaysia
Commanders of the Order of the Defender of the Realm
Grand Commanders of the Order of Loyalty to the Crown of Malaysia